Abdul Gafur (born 19 February 1929) is a Bangladeshi journalist, teacher, writer and language activist of the Bengali Language Movement that took place in the erstwhile East Pakistan (currently Bangladesh) to make Bengali one of the state languages of Pakistan. He was one of the noted members of Tamaddun Majlish, an Islamic cultural organization which played a vital role at the start of the movement.

In recognition of his contributions to the language movement, he was awarded Ekushey Padak by the Government of Bangladesh in 2005.

Early life
Gafur was born on 19 February 1929 in Pangsha thana of Greater Faridpur District (now Rajbari District of Bangladesh) during the time of British Raj to Haji Habil Uddin Munshi and Shukurunnesa Khatun. He completed his secondary education in 1945 from the local Maizuddin High Madrasa and higher secondary from Kabi Nazrul Government College in 1947. Later he was admitted to the Bengali language and literature department of Dhaka University. Including him, there were only three students in his department. The other two were Nurul Islam Patwari and Momtaz Begum.

When the Language Movement started, he took part in the movement as an enthusiastic activist and this slowed down his educational life. Later, he obtained his post-graduate degree from the Social Welfare Department of the same university in 1962.

References

1929 births
Living people
Bengali language movement activists
Recipients of the Ekushey Padak